Shaista Nuzhat ( (Shahmukhi)) (born 1960s) is a Punjabi poet, writer, linguist, and researcher on Punjabi language and literature. She is founder director of the Punjab Institute of Language, Art and Culture (PILAC) in Lahore.

Biography

Early life and education
Shaista belongs to Gujranwala District, Punjab, Pakistan. She gained a Ph.D. in Philosophy from the University of the Punjab, Lahore. She is popularly known as a poet in Punjabi and Urdu, a columnist, and a writer, and has been prominent in public speaking.

Career
Shaista started her career as a lecturer in philosophy and later as a journalist. She has worked as a sub-editor in various national daily newspapers. She holds the portfolio of a public sector official and bureaucrat, working with the Government of Pakistan. She is alumni of National Institute of Management (NIM), Lahore and attended 12th Senior Management Course (SMC).

PILAC
Shaista has worked to promote Punjabi language, literature, art and culture. As a result of her efforts, the Punjab Legislative Assembly passed a bill for the establishment of an institution named the Punjab Institute of Language, Art & Culture, which started functioning, initially, in 2005, in a rented building at Shadman Colony, Lahore, as part of the Ministry of Information, Culture and Youth Affairs, with Shaista as the founding director. The Institute brought together Punjabi writers, poets, and journalists in the PILAC (commonly known as Punjabi Complex), at 01-Qaddafi Stadium, Ferozpur Road, Lahore, with the support of Chaudhry Pervaiz Elahi, the Ex. Chief Minister, Punjab. PILAC has been functioning from this complex since 2007, after an inauguration by Elahi. Shaista also started Pakistan's first Punjabi FM-radio channel named FM-Pechanway (FM-95) Punjab Rang, under the umbrella of PILAC, broadcasting from the Punjabi Complex.

Foreign tours
Shaista has visited Saudi Arabia, Bahrain, Thailand, India, UK, France, Denmark, Norway, Sweden, Netherlands, Singapore, United Arab Emirates, Hong Kong-China, South Korea, and Sri Lanka, to deliver lectures and research papers in connection with promoting the Punjabi language.

Publications

Awards and honors

References

Living people
Linguists from Pakistan
People from Wazirabad
1963 births